The Elgi is a river in Yakutia in Russia, a left tributary of the Indigirka. The Elgi Plateau is named after the Elgi River.

Inhabited places
It belonged to the Oymyakon District and was abolished in 2007.

Course
The Elgi is formed by the confluence of the Degdega and Kao rivers. It flows across the Elgi Plateau in a wide arch, first roughly westwards and then roughly eastwards.

The river's drainage basin measures . The Elgi freezes up in October and remains icebound until late May through early June.

See also
List of rivers of Russia
Yana-Oymyakon Highlands§Hydrography

References

Rivers of the Sakha Republic